This article is about the significance of the year 1961 to Wales and its people.

Incumbents

Archbishop of Wales – Edwin Morris, Bishop of Monmouth
Archdruid of the National Eisteddfod of Wales – Trefin

Events
16 February – The , a loaded tanker barge bound for Sharpness from Swansea, turns over in the Severn Estuary.
17 February – The BP Explorer is seen bouncing upside down through the recently wrecked (October 26, 1960) Severn Railway Bridge. Her crew of five men are killed.
1 October – Tabernacle Chapel, Cardiff, hosts the first-ever broadcast of the long-running national BBC Television series Songs of Praise.
8 November – In a referendum on Sunday opening of public houses, the counties of Anglesey, Cardiganshire, Caernarfonshire, Carmarthenshire, Denbighshire, Merionethshire, Montgomeryshire and Pembrokeshire all vote to stay "dry".
9 November – Rosemarie Frankland, originally from Rhosllanerchrugog, wins the Miss World title.
19 November – During construction of the Severn Bridge three men fall into the river. A rescue boat crewed by two men sets sail from Chepstow, not knowing that the three men have been picked up safely by a ferry, the Severn Princess. Two empty tanker barges coming down from Sharpness collide with the rescue boat, which has no navigation lights. One member of the rescue boat crew is drowned.
The Llyn Celyn reservoir is constructed in the valley of the River Tryweryn in North Wales to provide water for Liverpool, destroying the village of Capel Celyn.
Gwynfor Evans becomes president of the Celtic League.
Formation in Pontypridd of the first Local Spiritual Assembly of the Baháʼí Faith entirely of native Welsh Baháʼís.

Arts and literature
Richard Booth opens the first used bookstore in Hay-on-Wye.
Keith Baxter makes his Broadway debut as King Henry VIII in A Man for All Seasons.

Awards
National Eisteddfod of Wales, held in Rhosllanerchrugog:
Chairing of the Bard – Emrys Edwards
Crowning of the Bard – L. Haydn Lewis
Prose Medal – withheld
Gold Medal: Fine Art – Ceri Richards

New books

English language
Dannie Abse – The Eccentric
Richard Hughes – The Fox in the Attic
Bertrand Russell – Fact and Fiction
Emlyn Williams – George
Raymond Williams – The Long Revolution

Welsh language
Pennar Davies – Yr Efrydd o Lyn Cynon
Islwyn Ffowc Elis – Tabyrddau'r Tabongo
W. J. Gruffydd (Elerydd) – Ffenestri
Caradog Prichard – Un Nos Ola Leuad

Music
Alun Hoddinott – Concerto for Piano, Winds and Percussion

Film
Ronald Lewis stars in Scream of Fear and Stop Me Before I Kill.
Victor Spinetti makes his screen debut in The Gentle Terror.
Clifford Evans stars in The Curse of the Werewolf.
Pirates of Tortuga, American adventure based on the Welsh privateer, Henry Morgan

Broadcasting

Welsh-language television
Ambell i Gan
Pwt o'r Papur
Gair o Gyngor

English-language television
7 April – The Independent Television Authority (ITA) invites bids for its west and north Wales licence. On 6 June, the franchise is awarded to the Wales Television Association.
20 June – The Postmaster General of the United Kingdom, Reginald Bevins, informs the Wales Television Association that approval has been given for an ITA transmitter in the Flint-Denbigh area.

Sport
Boxing – Howard Winstone wins the British featherweight title.
BBC Wales Sports Personality of the Year – Bryn Meredith

Births
24 January – Tarki Micallef, professional footballer
7 May – Phil Campbell, rock guitarist
5 July – Gareth Jones ("Gaz Top"), television presenter
7 July – Steve Brace, long-distance runner
8 August – Simon Weston, war hero
18 August – Huw Edwards, newsreader
30 August – Delyth Morgan, Baroness Morgan of Drefelin, charity worker and Labour peer
29 September – Julia Gillard, Prime Minister of Australia (in Barry)
20 October – Ian Rush, footballer
1 November – Nicky Grist, racing driver
date unknown
Ifor ap Glyn, Welsh-language poet and television presenter
Twm Morys, poet

Deaths
14 January – William Bowen, Army officer, 62
18 January – William Jones, poet, 64
2 February – Kate Williams Evans, suffragette, 84
10 February – Tom Beynon, Presbyterian minister and historian, 74
18 April – John Evans, Labour politician, 85
30 April – Charles Williams, academic, 55
28 June – Huw Menai, poet, 74
3 July – Albert Jenkin, Wales international rugby player, 88
14 August – Alec James, cricketer, 72
31 October – Augustus John, painter, 83
20 November – Edwin Thomas Maynard, Wales international rugby player, 83
4 December – John Pugh, Archdeacon of Carmarthen, 76
date unknown – Llewelyn Davies, footballer, 79/80

See also
1961 in Northern Ireland
1961 in Scotland
1961 in the United Kingdom

References

 
Wales